Pothukallu (Pothukal) is located between Palunda and Munderi (9.0 km from Palunda in the Nilambur Taluk of Malappuram District). Pothukallu is well known for its greenery, hospitality of the natives, and availability of all basic amenities, including schools, hospitals, shopping centers etc.
There is a police station,forest station, mosque, church, and temple at nearby locations. Pothukallu is located at the boundary of three districts namely, Wayanad and Malappuram of Kerala state and The Nilgiris of Tamil Nadu.

Administration

State    : Kerala

District : Malappuram

Taluk    : Nilambur

Local Body  : Pothukallu Grama Panchayath

Parliament constituency : Wayanad

Member of Parliament : Rahul Gandhi

Legislative Assembly: Nilambur

Member of Legislative Assembly : P V Anwar

Sub RTO     : Nilambur (KL 71)

Nearest Cities: Edakkara, Chungathara, Nilambur

Area Telephone Code: 04931

Postal Code: 679334

Culture
Pothukallu village is one of the most beautiful places in Malappuram district. People from all communities live with cooperation and unity. The area was part of Nilambur Kovilakam before independence.

Naxalite threat
In November, 2016, three naxalites were killed near Karulai in an encounter with Kerala police. Naxalite leader Kappu Devaraj from Andhra Pradesh is included in the list of killed in the incident. 
Villages like Mundakkadavu, Kalkullam and Uchakkulam near Karulai are threatened by Naxalite attacks.  Naxalites visit the locality regularly and ask for food and shelter from the tribals.  The police are also combing the area regularly but have not arrested any naxalites. 
On 27 September 2016, there was firing between the Maoists and the Kerala police in this area and no one was injured in this incident.

Transportation
Pothukallu village connects to other parts of India through Nilambur town. The proposed Hill highway SH 59 (Nandarapadavu in Kasargod to Parassala in Thiruvananthapuram via Meppadi) is passing through Pothukallu.  State Highway SH 28(Kozhikode- Nilambur - Gudallur Road) starts from Ramanattukara passes through Nilambur and connects to Ooty, Mysore and Bangalore. National highway NH 66 passes through Ramanattukara connects to Kannur, Goa and Mumbai. Nilambur- Valancheri road SH 73 connects Nilambur to Perinthalmanna in shortest distance. Nilambur- Perumbilavu SH 39 connects to Thrissur, Kottayam, Ernakulam and Thiruvananthapuram via Perinthalmanna.  The nearest airport is at Kozhikode.  The nearest major railway station is Nilambur Road.

Nearest Medical College : Manjeri Govt. Medical College

Nearest District Hospital : Nilambur Govt. District Hospital

Nearest Checkpost: Vazhikkadavu

Nearest KSRTC Bus station : Nilambur

Pothukallu is accessible by road from Nilambur Town.  The distance is 20 km. 
 Nilambur to Chungathara: 9 km
 Chungathara to Pothukallu: 11 km
 Pothukallu to Munderi: 8 km

Villages and Suburbs
 Uppada, Anakkallu, Paduanagar
 Muthukulam and Nettikkulam, Pothukallu
 Kunippala, Velumbiyampadam, Ampittanpotti, Neerpuzha mukkam,Sattharumpadi
 Thamburattikallu, Munderi
 Bhoodan colony, Panakayam
 Kodalipoyil, Chembankolly
 Kavalappara, Santhigram, Vellimuttam

Important Landmarks
 Catholicate HSS, Pothukallu
 Pothukallu Gramapanchayath 
 Pothukallu Village office
 Pothukallu KSFE
 Pothukallu Bus stand
 Pothukallu KSEB Section
 Pothukallu PHC
 Dharmasastha Temple, Thamburattikkallu
 Farm Club, Bhoodhanam Colony, Pothukallu
 Assembly of God Church, Pothukallu
 S.N.Guru Seva Mandir, Nettikullam
 St.Mary's Catholic Church, Pathirippadam
 Chathamunda Masjidh, Chathamunda
 NSS School, Uppada
 St. Paul's Malankara Catholic Church, Uppada
 New Holy Bible College, Palunda
 A L P School, Boodan colony
 Post Office, Bhoodan colony
 Siva Temple, Santhigram
 St.Marys orthodox church, Muthukulam
 MKMM LPS Velumbiyampadam
 Nirmala HSS Erumamunda
 Pothukal Forest Station,Kunipala
 Friends Supermarket, pothukallu

References

Villages in Malappuram district
Nilambur area